Claude Antoine Jean Georges Napoléon Coste (27 June 1805 – 14 January 1883) was a French classical guitarist and composer.

Biography
Napoléon Coste was born in Amondans (Doubs), near Besançon, France. He was first taught the guitar by his mother, an accomplished player. As a teenager he became a teacher of the instrument and appeared in three concerts in the Franche-Comté. In 1829, at the age of 24, he moved to Paris where he studied under Fernando Sor and quickly established himself as the leading French virtuoso guitarist [source: Ari van Vliet: Napoléon Coste, Biography, 2016] However, the demand for guitarists was in decline and, though his brilliance provided financial stability he had to self-publish his works. Napoléon Coste was influenced by the Early Classical-Romantic composers of the time including Hector Berlioz. Coste's Opus no.47, La Source du Lyson is inspired by nature much like Berlioz's program music.

Coste injured his left shoulder in 1863 as a result of an accident but this didn't bring his performing career to an end because he performed in public until 1881. After Sor's death, Coste edited and republished Sor's original method for guitar as Méthode complète pour la Guitare par Ferdinand Sor, rédigée et augmentée [refingered and expanded] de nombreux exemples et leçons par N. Coste.

Coste was a member of the masonic lodge Les Frères Unis Inséparables.

He had a special fondness for playing on a seven string guitar. He is known as one of the first composers to transcribe guitar music of the 17th century into modern musical notation. He died at age 77, leaving a significant catalogue of original compositions. Napoleon Coste was famous for his unique seven string guitar with a “floating” 7th string typically tuned to D or C called the Lacôte Heptachord. Tonally this invention created more depth when played as the floating string would vibrate sympathetically even as the other strings were plucked.

List of works

Works published with opus numbers

Op. 2: Variations et Finale... sur un motif favori de la Famille Suisse de Weigl ("Variations and Finale ... on a favorite theme of the Swiss Family Weigl")
Op. 3: 2 Quadrilles de contredanses ("2 Contredance Quadrilles")
Op. 4: Fantasie ... composée sur un motif du 'Ballet d'Armide ("Fantasy ... Composed on a Theme from Armida's Ball")
Op. 5: Souvenirs de Flandres ("Memories of Flanders")
Op. 6: Fantaisie de concert ("Fantasy Concert")
Op. 7: 16 Valses favorites de Johann Strauss ("16 Waltz Favorites by Johann Strauss")
Op. 9: Divertissement sur 'Lucia di Lammermoor''' ("Divertissement on [the opera] Lucia di Lammermoor")
Op. 10: Scherzo et pastorale (for two guitars)
Op. 11: Grand capriceOp. 12: Rondeau de concertOp. 13: Caprice sur … La Cachucha 
Op. 14: Deuxième Polonaise ("Second Polonaise")
Op. 15: Le Tournoi fantaisie chevaleresque ("The Fantasy Chivalry Tournament")
Op. 16: Fantaisie sur deux motifs de la 'Norma ("Fantasy on Themes from [the opera] Norma")
Op. 17: La Vallée d'Ornans ("The Ornans Valley")
Op. 18: Les Bords du Rhin ("The Banks of the Rhine")
Op. 19: DelfzilOp. 19b: La RomanescaOp. 20: Le Zuyderzée ("The Zuyderzee")
Op. 21: Les Cloches ("The Bells")
Op. 22: MeulanOp. 23: Les Soirées d'Auteuil ("Evenings in Auteuil")
Op. 24: Grand soloOp. 25: Romance pour hautbois et pianoOp. 27: Le Passage des Alpes ("The Trail in the Alps")
Op. 28b: Fantaisie symphonique ("Symphonic Fantasy")
Op. 29: La Chasse des sylphes ("The Hunt of the Sylphes")
Op. 30: Grande sérénade 
Op. 31: Le Départ, fantaisie dramatique ("The Departure, Dramatic Fantasy") 
Op. 33: MazurkaOp. 34: Le Montagnard Divertissement Pastoral pour Hautbois ou Violon et Piano ou Guitare
Op. 36: Cantilène pour hautbois et pianoOp. 37: Cavatine pour hautbois et pianoOp. 38: 25 Études de genre ("25 Typical Études") 
Op. 39: Andante et menuet 
Op. 41: Feuilles d'automne ("Autumn Leaves")
Op. 42: La Ronde de Mai ("May Rondo")
Op. 43: Marche funèbre et rondeau ("Funeral March and Rondo")
Op. 44: Andante et polonaise (Souvenirs du Jura) ("Memories of Jura")
Op. 45: Divagation ("Wandering")
Op. 46  Valse Favorite ("Favorite Waltz") 
Op. 47: La Source du Lyson ("The Lyson River Spring")
Op. 48: Quatre MarchesOp. 49: Six PréludesOp. 50: Adagio et divertissements 
Op. 51: Récréation du Guitariste ("The Guitarist's Break").
Op. 52: Le Livre d'or du guitariste ("The Guitarist's Golden Book").
Op. 53: Six Pièces originales (Rêverie, Rondeau, 2 Menuets, Scherzo, Étude)Works without opus numbersMéditation de nuit ("Night Meditation")Andante et allegroDivertissementIntroduction et variations sur un motif de Rossini ("Introduction and Variations on a Theme by Rossini")Berceuse ("Lullaby")Kleines TonstückPastoraleValse en ré majeur  ("Waltz in D major")Valse en la majeur ("Waltz in A major")Valse des roses ("Waltz of the Roses")DuettoSources

Instruments
Photos of Coste's guitar made by René Lacote (Museum Cité de la Musique in Paris)
The Lacôte Heptacorde by Gregg Miner (www.harpguitars.net)
Lacôte / Coste Heptacorde by Bernhard Kresse (www.harpguitars.net)
Nine-string guitar, 1827 by René Lacôte (belonged to Eugène Peletin of Paris, a student of Napoleon Coste. It was part of Coste's collection.)
The Lacôte-Coste guitar by Bruno Marlat (see page 6, ref)

Sheet music
Rischel & Birket-Smith's Collection of guitar music 1 Det Kongelige Bibliotek, Denmark
Boije Collection The Music Library of Sweden

Free scores at the Mutopia Project
Napoléon Coste Complete Works

Bibliography
 Noël Roncet: Napoleon Coste, Composer, 1805-1883 (London: Tecla Editions, 2008)
 Ari van Vliet: Napoléon Coste: Composer and Guitarist in the Musical Life of 19th-Century Paris (Zwolle: Cumuli Foundation, 2015)
 Ingrid & Werner Holzschuh (editors): Napoleon Coste. Späte Briefe, 1867-1882'' (Hamburg: Trekel, 2016)

References

External links
Brief biography of Napoléon Coste on Naxos Records site.

1805 births
1883 deaths
19th-century classical composers
19th-century French composers
19th-century French male musicians
Composers for the classical guitar
French classical guitarists
French male classical composers
French male guitarists
French Romantic composers
People from Doubs
19th-century guitarists